Sociological Research Online is a sociological journal, published quarterly (March, June, September, December) since March 1996. It is an online-only, peer reviewed journal. It was originally published by  a consortium of the British Sociological Association, SAGE Publications, the University of Surrey and the University of Stirling. In 2017, the University of Surrey and the University of Stirling stepped down and SAGE began publishing the journal on behalf of the British Sociological Association.

The journal is currently edited by Professor Kahryn Hughes (University of Leeds, UK), Dr Anna Tarrant (University of Lincoln, UK), Dr Angharad Beckett (University of Leeds, UK), Dr Greg Hollin (University of Leeds, UK), Professor Jason  Hughes (University of Leicester, UK), Dr Katy Wright (University of Leeds, UK), and Professor Lucie Middlemiss (University of Leeds, UK).

Abstracting, indexing and impact factor
The journal is indexed by ISI, EBSCO, SCOPUS and others. As of 2020, the journal had an impact factor of 2.417, ranking 56 out of 149 in Sociology.

Access
The journal is available without charge to individuals who do not have access to institutional networks.

References 

Sociology journals
Quarterly journals
Publications established in 1996
Online-only journals
British Sociological Association